Gerard Doherty (born 1953 or 1954) is a British former trade unionist.

Based in Glasgow, Doherty worked for British Rail, and joined the Transport Salaried Staffs' Association (TSSA) in 1972.  He soon became chairman of his branch of the union, and then became secretary of its Glasgow and West of Scotland Political Advisory Council.  In 1988, he was elected to the union's executive committee, and then in 1991 he began working full-time for the union as its Irish secretary.

In 1995, Doherty returned to the UK as a divisional secretary for the union, working at its headquarters in London.  He was elected as general secretary of the TSSA in 2004, pledging to keep it affiliated to the Labour Party and use those links to campaign on the ownership and integration of railways in the UK.  He was also elected to the General Council of the Trades Union Congress.

Under Doherty's leadership, the TSSA entered into merger talks with the National Union of Rail, Maritime and Transport Workers, and Doherty took early retirement in 2011 in the hope of facilitating these.

In retirement, Doherty served as a director of South Central Youth, a charity aiming to dissuade young people in South London from joining gangs.  In 2018, he was appointed as a trustee of the Railways Pension Scheme, on the nomination of the TSSA.

References

1950s births
Living people
General Secretaries of the Transport Salaried Staffs' Association
Members of the General Council of the Trades Union Congress
Trade unionists from Glasgow